Confession No.1 is the first studio album by Indonesian singer Afgan. It was released on April 1, 2008. In the album, the singer is joined by musicians Fajar PJ Maringka (Fajar "Element"), Harry Budiman, Deddy Dhukun, Dian Pernama Poetra, and Bebi Romeo as composer.

The album has 13 songs, including "Terima Kasih Cinta", "Tanpa Batas Waktu", "Sadis", "Betapa Kucinta Padamu", "Hanya Ada Satu", and "My Confession", written by himself.

Track listing

References

2008 debut albums
Afgansyah Reza albums
Indonesian-language albums